TTR may refer to:

Games
 Ticket to Ride (board game), a 2004 rail-themed Eurogame
  Ticket to Ride (video game) , its 2008 digital adaptation
 Toontown Rewritten, a fan-made revival of the online role-playing game Toontown Online

Linguistics
 Type-token ratio, a lexical density formula
 Translation Terminology Writing (Traduction, terminologie, rédaction), a French-language journal

Transportation
 Talleyrand Terminal Railroad, Jacksonville, Florida, United States
 Tai Tong Road stop, an MTR light-rail stop in Hong Kong
 Pongtiku Airport, Rantetayo, Sulawesi, Indonesia (by IATA code)
 Toronto Terminals Railway, Canadian operator of the Union Station Rail Corridor

Other uses
 Tonopah Test Range, a military installation in Nevada, United States
 Transthyretin, a plasma protein
 Relative track and record, an access method in a direct-access storage device

See also
 Ticket to Ride (disambiguation)